Admiral Hotham may refer to:

Alan Geoffrey Hotham (1876–1965), British Royal Navy admiral
Charles Frederick Hotham (1843–1925), British Royal Navy Admiral of the Fleet
Henry Hotham (1777–1833), British Royal Navy vice admiral
William Hotham, 1st Baron Hotham (1736–1813), British Royal Navy admiral
William Hotham (Royal Navy officer, born 1772), British Royal Navy admiral
William Hotham (Royal Navy officer, born 1794), British Royal Navy admiral